Menegazzia subsimilis is a species of lichen in the family Parmeliaceae It is found scattered across the world, including Oceania (Hawaii, Solomon Islands), Asia (Japan, Papua New Guinea, Russia), Europe (Austria, Germany, Portugal), South America (Ecuador, Peru), the Caribbean (Dominican Republic, Jamaica) and North America (Canada, USA). It has recently been recorded for the first times in Tibet (2005), in the British Isles, and in Malaysia and Indonesia (2007).

The lichen was originally described as Parmelia subsimilis by Swedish lichenologist Adolf Hugo Magnusson in 1941, based on specimens found in Hawaii. A year later, Rolf Santesson transferred the species to the genus Menegazzia. The species was not reported outside of Hawaii until a 1993 collection from southeast Asia.

See also
List of Menegazzia species

References

subsimilis
Lichen species
Lichens of Asia
Lichens of Europe
Lichens of North America
Lichens of Ecuador
Lichens of Peru
Lichens of Oceania
Lichens described in 1942
Taxa named by Adolf Hugo Magnusson